Roscoe Powers Conkling (May 3, 1889 – October 28, 1954) was a justice of the Missouri Supreme Court from 1947 to 1954, including a period as chief justice.

Biography
Conkling was born on May 3, 1889 in Carrollton, Missouri to Virgil Marcellus Conkling (1865-1912) and Alpha Ann Powers (1866-1951). He attended school there and, from 1905, in Kansas City, Missouri. He graduated in Law from the University of Missouri in 1912 and began practicing law that year in Kansas City. After army service in the Field Artillery during World War I he returned to legal practice and moved to St Joseph in 1924. He became prosecuting attorney for Jackson County and special commissioner of the Missouri Supreme Court. He also served as a member of the State Board of Bar Examiners (1926–30), and as president of the Buchanan County Bar Association.

He was appointed to the Missouri Supreme Court under the states non-partisan court plan on January 1, 1947 during the first term of Governor Phil M. Donnelly. He was re-elected to the court on November 2, 1948 for a 12-year term, and had recently completed his turn as chief justice of the court when he died. He was awarded an honorary degree from William Jewell College in 1954.

Conkling married Mildred Scott in 1914, and they had two daughters. He had a heart attack and died on his way to St. Mary's Hospital on October 28, 1954 in Jefferson City, Missouri.

References

 "Heart Attack Fatal to Judge Conkling of State Supreme Court", The Chillicothe Constitution Tribune, October 28, 1954.
 "R.P. Conkling, Supreme Court Justice, Dies", Jefferson City Post-Tribune, October 28, 1954.

External links

Judges of the Supreme Court of Missouri
1889 births
1954 deaths
People from Carrollton, Missouri
University of Missouri School of Law alumni
Politicians from Kansas City, Missouri
20th-century American judges
Lawyers from Kansas City, Missouri
20th-century American lawyers
United States Army personnel of World War I
United States Army soldiers